Eiichi Nakamura may refer to:

, Japanese field hockey player
  (born 1930), Japanese politician

, Japanese chemist